Mihata can refer to:

 Mihata, an alternative spelling of Michata, a settlement on the Greek island of Kefalonia
 Mihata Station, a train station in Nabari, Japan
 Joryu Mihata, a Japanese artist